Holders of the post of tenant of Herm.

Prince Gebhard Fürst Blücher von Wahlstatt (1889–1914)
Compton Mackenzie (1920–1923)
Percival Lea Dewhurst Perry (1923–1939)
A. G. Jefferies (1948–1949)
Major Alexander Gough (Peter) Wood (1949–1998)
Adrian Heyworth and Pennie Wood Heyworth (c.1980–2008) 
The Starboard Settlement (John and Julia Singer) (2008- )

References